The  University of Saint Joseph is a private Roman Catholic university in West Hartford, Connecticut. It was founded in 1932 by the Sisters of Mercy of Connecticut. The university is accredited by the New England Commission of Higher Education.

History
In 2004 psychology Professor Pamela Trotman Reid became the first African American President of the university when she was appointed in 2008. She served the university until her retirement in 2014.

In November 2016, the University of Saint Joseph began its comprehensive research and review of becoming a coeducational institution. Based on this review, the university began admitting male students to all full-time undergraduate programs in the fall of 2018.

Facilities
The University of Saint Joseph has maintained a distinctive Georgian brick architecture in most of its 19 buildings, including five residence halls, a library, student life building, administration and classroom buildings, and an arts center with a theater and art gallery, among others.  The athletic complex features a six-lane pool, gymnasium, suspended jogging track, dance studio, fitness center, outdoor track, softball field, and tennis courts.

The buildings are arranged around two tree-lined quadrangles on an  campus designed by the Olmsted Brothers. Approximately 45 percent of the full-time undergraduate students live on campus. There are 1,039 undergraduates in the Undergraduate Programs.

The School of Pharmacy is fully accredited by the Accreditation Council for Pharmacy Education; it is located in the XL Center complex in downtown Hartford, CT.

Athletics
Saint Joseph College teams participate as a member of the National Collegiate Athletic Association's Division III. The Blue Jays are a member of the Great Northeast Athletic Conference (GNAC). Women's sports include basketball, cross country, field hockey, lacrosse, softball, soccer, swimming & diving, tennis and volleyball. There are also eight club sports.

In September 2018, the university made headlines by signing Jim Calhoun, a Naismith Memorial Basketball Hall of Fame inductee, as head coach of the newly formed men's basketball team.

References

External links

University of Saint Joseph official athletics website

 
1932 establishments in Connecticut
Buildings and structures in West Hartford, Connecticut
Educational institutions established in 1932
University of Saint Joseph
Universities and colleges in Hartford County, Connecticut
Former women's universities and colleges in the United States
Liberal arts colleges in Connecticut